Ediane Gomes is a  Brazilian former mixed martial artist who competed in the Bantamweight division. She notably fought in the Invicta FC.

Mixed martial arts career
Gomes made her MMA debut on August 16, 2007. After winning her first five fights, Gomes then faced future UFC Women's Bantamweight and Featherweight Champion, Amanda Nunes. She lost via TKO in the second round.

After her first-round victory over Marissa Caldwell at Bitetti Combat 6, Gomes fought future UFC Women's Bantamweight Champion Ronda Rousey, in Rousey's MMA debut. Gomes lost via armbar 25 seconds into the fight.

Invicta Fighting Championships

Gomes made her successful Invicta FC debut at Invicta FC 3 defeating Katalina Malungahu via rear naked choke in the first round.

Gomes was then set to take on Hiroko Yamanaka at Invicta FC 4. She won via unanimous decision.

Gomes was expected to take on Cristiane Justino at Invicta FC 5 but pulled out due to injury. She was then expected to return at Invicta FC 6 against Julia Budd but Budd pulled out due to injury and was replaced by Tamikka Brents. Brents also pulled due to injury as was replaced by Charmaine Tweet. The fight was then cancelled all together due to Tweet having visa issues.

Gomes finally returned at Invicta FC 8 taking on Tonya Evinger. She lost via first round armbar.

Gomes then faced Raquel Pa'aluhi at Invicta FC 12: Kankaanpää vs. Souza. She lost via unanimous decision.

Gomes faced Pam Sorenson at Invicta FC 23: Porto vs. Niedźwiedź. She won the fight via split decision.

In May 2018, Gomes announced her retirement from mixed martial arts on her social media.

Mixed martial arts record

|-
| Win
| align=center| 11–4
| Pam Sorenson
| Decision (split)
| Invicta FC 23: Porto vs. Niedźwiedź
| 
| align=center| 3
| align=center| 5:00
| Kansas City, Missouri, United States
| 
|-
| Loss
| align=center| 10–4
| Raquel Pa'aluhi
| Decision (unanimous)
| Invicta FC 12: Kankaanpää vs. Souza
| 
| align=center| 3
| align=center| 5:00
| Kansas City, Missouri, United States
| 
|-
| Loss
| align=center| 10–3
| Tonya Evinger
| Submission (armbar)
| Invicta FC 8: Waterson vs. Tamada
| 
| align=center| 1
| align=center| 3:31
| Kansas City, Missouri, United States
| Bantamweight debut.
|-
| Win
| align=center| 10–2
| Hiroko Yamanaka
| Decision (unanimous)
| Invicta FC 4: Esparza vs. Hyatt
| 
| align=center| 3
| align=center| 5:00
| Kansas City, Kansas, United States
| 
|-
| Win
| align=center| 9–2
| Katalina Malungahu
| Submission (rear-naked choke)
| Invicta FC 3: Penne vs. Sugiyama
| 
| align=center| 1
| align=center| 4:19
| Kansas City, Kansas, United States
| 
|-
| Win
| align=center| 8–2
| Leslie Smith
| Decision (unanimous)
| BEP 5 - Breast Cancer Beatdown
| 
| align=center| 3
| align=center| 5:00
| Fletcher, North Carolina, United States
| 
|-
| Win
| align=center| 7–2
| Katrine Alendal
| Submission (Ankle lock)
| BlackEye Promotions 4
| 
| align=center| 1
| align=center| 0:42
| Fletcher, North Carolina, United States
| 
|-
| Loss
| align=center| 6–2
| Ronda Rousey
| Submission (armbar)
| KOTC: Turning Point
| 
| align=center| 1
| align=center| 0:25
| Tarzana, California, United States
| 
|-
| Win
| align=center| 6–1
| Marissa Caldwell
| Submission (armbar)
| World Extreme Fighting 45
| 
| align=center| 1
| align=center| 1:46
| Jacksonville, Florida, United States
| 
|-
| Loss
| align=center| 5–1
| Amanda Nunes
| TKO (punches)
| Bitetti Combat 6
| 
| align=center| 2
| align=center| 3:00
| Brazil
| 
|-
| Win
| align=center| 5–0
| Ana Maria
| Submission (armbar)
| Jungle Fight 11
| 
| align=center| 2
| align=center| 3:01
| Rio de Janeiro, Brazil
| 
|-
| Win
| align=center| 4–0
| Michelle Farias
| Submission (armbar)
| Jungle Fight 10
| 
| align=center| 1
| align=center| 0:48
| Rio de Janeiro, Brazil
| 
|-
| Win
| align=center| 3–0
| Pamela Rivelles
| TKO (punches)
| Beach Fight Festival
| 
| align=center| 1
| align=center| 1:36
| Sao Paulo, Brazil
| 
|-
| Win
| align=center| 2–0
| Elaine Santiago de Lima 
| Submission (armbar)
| Cla Fighting Championships 2
| 
| align=center| 1
| align=center| 2:36
| Sao Paulo, Brazil
| 
|-
| Win
| align=center| 1–0
| Elaine Santiago de Lima 
| Submission (armbar)
| Extreme Fight Championships 1
| 
| align=center| 1
| align=center| n/a
| Sao Paulo, Brazil
|

References

External links

1980 births
Living people
Sportspeople from São Paulo
Featherweight mixed martial artists
Bantamweight mixed martial artists
Brazilian female mixed martial artists